"Every Which Way but Loose" is a song written by Steve Dorff, Snuff Garrett and Milton Brown, and recorded by American country music artist Eddie Rabbitt. It was released in November 1978 as the only single from the soundtrack to the 1978 film of the same name, it spent three weeks atop the Billboard magazine Hot Country Singles chart in February 1979.

Highest debut
Released just weeks before Every Which Way But Loose premiered nationwide, the song debuted at No. 18 on the Billboard Hot Country Singles chart, the highest debut since the inception of the 100-position chart in July 1973. The record was later tied by Garth Brooks' "Good Ride Cowboy" in 2005.

Charts

Weekly charts

Year-end charts

References

External links
[ Allmusic — Every Which Way But Loose by Eddie Rabbitt].

1979 singles
1978 songs
Eddie Rabbitt songs
Songs written by Steve Dorff
Songs written by Snuff Garrett
Song recordings produced by Snuff Garrett
Elektra Records singles